Brumfield v. Cain, 576 U.S. 305 (2015), was a United States Supreme Court case in which the Court held that because Brumfield satisfied 28 U.S.C. § 2254(d)(2)’s requirements, he was entitled to have his Atkins v. Virginia claim considered on the merits in federal court.

Background
Kevan Brumfield (born January 7, 1973) was sentenced to death for the January 7, 1993 murder of off-duty Baton Rouge police officer Betty Smothers. Brumfield and his accomplice, Henri Broadway (born September 7, 1970), shot and killed Officer Smothers while she was escorting the manager of a grocery store to the bank. Smothers was the mother of Warrick Dunn, who later became a running back for the Tampa Bay Buccaneers and the Atlanta Falcons.

Brumfield had an IQ score of 75, had a fourth-grade reading level, had been treated at psychiatric hospitals as a child, had a learning disability, and had been placed in special education classes. The lower courts denied Brumfield an Atkins hearing and sentenced him to death.

Opinion of the Court
Justice Sonia Sotomayor delivered the opinion of the Court. She stated that the state's denial of Brumfield's request was based on an "unreasonable determination of the facts" in regards to his mental ability. In addition, the state disregarded Brumfield's adaptive skills, or rather the adaptive impairments that prevented Brumfield from being able to process information. By a 5–4 vote, the opinion of the lower court was vacated and the cause was remanded.

Justice Clarence Thomas filed a dissent, arguing that since the majority still agreed with the factual record that supported the state court's decision, they cannot rule that the decision was "unreasonable" just because they would have reached a different conclusion. Thomas also added a picture of Smothers in her police uniform in the appendix of his dissent.

Justice Samuel Alito joined Justice Thomas' dissent in part, and then filed a second dissent to simply state that Thomas' inclusion of Warrick Dunn's life story as a contrast to Brumfield's, while inspiring, is not an essential part of the legal analysis.

Subsequent developments
On July 20, 2016, Brumfield was resentenced to life in prison after he was ruled intellectually disabled and therefore ineligible for execution. Broadway remains on death row for his involvement in the murder, although it was Brumfield who actually fired the fatal shots which killed Smothers, Broadway had been the one to wound the grocery store manager. The getaway driver, West Paul, was sentenced to twenty-five years for his role in the murder. Paul was returned to jail in 2017 after he was booked on charges related to shoplifting. Prior to his return to jail he had only recently been released for his part in the murder of Smothers.

See also
 Warrick Dunn
 List of United States Supreme Court cases, volume 576
 List of United States Supreme Court decisions on capital punishment

References

Further reading

External links
 

United States Supreme Court cases
United States Supreme Court cases of the Roberts Court
2015 in United States case law
History of Baton Rouge, Louisiana
Capital punishment in Louisiana
United States death penalty case law
United States disability case law